This is a list of listed buildings in East Ayrshire. The list is split out by parish.

 List of listed buildings in Auchinleck, East Ayrshire
 List of listed buildings in Cumnock And Holmhead, East Ayrshire
 List of listed buildings in Dalmellington, East Ayrshire
 List of listed buildings in Dalrymple, East Ayrshire
 List of listed buildings in Darvel, East Ayrshire
 List of listed buildings in Dunlop, East Ayrshire
 List of listed buildings in Fenwick, East Ayrshire
 List of listed buildings in Galston, East Ayrshire
 List of listed buildings in Kilmarnock, East Ayrshire
 List of listed buildings in Kilmaurs, East Ayrshire
 List of listed buildings in Loudoun, East Ayrshire
 List of listed buildings in Mauchline, East Ayrshire
 List of listed buildings in Muirkirk, East Ayrshire
 List of listed buildings in New Cumnock, East Ayrshire
 List of listed buildings in Newmilns And Greenholm, East Ayrshire
 List of listed buildings in Ochiltree, East Ayrshire
 List of listed buildings in Old Cumnock, East Ayrshire
 List of listed buildings in Riccarton, East Ayrshire
 List of listed buildings in Sorn, East Ayrshire
 List of listed buildings in Stair, East Ayrshire
 List of listed buildings in Stewarton, East Ayrshire
 List of listed buildings in Straiton, East Ayrshire

East Ayrshire